A Chapman function describes the integration of atmospheric absorption along a slant path on a spherical earth, relative to the vertical case. It applies to any quantity with a concentration decreasing exponentially with increasing altitude. To a first approximation, valid at small zenith angles, the Chapman function for optical absorption is equal to 

where z is the zenith angle and sec denotes the secant function. 

The Chapman function is named after Sydney Chapman, who introduced the function in 1931.

Definition 
In an isothermal model of the atmosphere, the density  varies exponentially with altitude  according to the Barometric formula:
,
where  denotes the density at sea level and  the so-called scale height.
The total amount of matter traversed by a vertical ray starting at altitude  towards infinity is given by the integrated density ("column depth")
.

For inclined rays having a zenith angle , the integration is not straight-forward due to the non-linear relationship between altitude and path length when considering the
curvature of Earth. Here, the integral reads
,
where we defined  ( denotes the Earth radius).

The Chapman function  is defined as the ratio between slant depth  and vertical column depth . Defining , it can be written as
.

Representations 
A number of different integral representations have been developed in the literature. Chapman's original representation reads
.

Huestis developed the representation
,
which does not suffer from numerical singularities present in Chapman's representation.

Special cases 
For  (horizontal incidence), the Chapman function reduces to
.
Here,  refers to the modified Bessel function of the second kind of the first order.
.
.
In practical applications related to the terrestrial atmosphere, where ,  is a good approximation for zenith angles up to 60° to 70°, depending on the accuracy required.

See also 
 Air mass
 Atmospheric physics
 Ionosphere

References

External links 
 Chapman function at Science World
 

Radio frequency propagation
Special functions